Brenda Sykes (born June 25, 1949) is an American actress who made a number of films and appeared in television series in the 1970s. She was discovered on The Dating Game.

Life and career 
Sykes was born in Shreveport, Louisiana, the daughter of a postal worker. She graduated from Susan Miller Dorsey High School in Los Angeles in 1967.

Sykes played Jim Brown's love interest in Black Gunn. According to Brown, he was responsible for her being cast in the role, an effort he made because he was attracted to her in real life. From 1973 to 1974, she co-starred on Ozzie's Girls as a college student boarding with Ozzie and Harriet Nelson.

She played the character Mandy, one of Jimmie Walker's girlfriends on the 1970s sitcom Good Times, made a starring role appearance on the first season of The Streets of San Francisco, and as Summer Johnson on the CBS series Executive Suite. Sykes was married to musician Gil Scott-Heron from 1978 to 1987 and is the mother of poet Gia Scott-Heron. "She was exquisitely beautiful, soft and refined. He was so full of fire, and she was the opposite. She was the water in his life," said the filmmaker Esther Anderson.

Sykes has been married to Paul C. Hudson since May 19, 1995.

Filmography

Television

References

External links

20th-century African-American people
20th-century African-American women
21st-century African-American people
21st-century African-American women
1949 births
Actors from Shreveport, Louisiana
Actresses from Louisiana
African-American actresses
American film actresses
American television actresses
Living people